Tsivilsky District (Śĕrpü rayonĕ) is an administrative and municipal district (raion), one of the twenty-one in the Chuvash Republic, Russia. It is located in the northeast of the republic and borders with Cheboksarsky District in the north and northwest, Mariinsko-Posadsky District in the northeast, Kanashsky District in the south, and with Krasnoarmeysky District in the west. Its administrative center is the town of Tsivilsk. Population:  The population of Tsivilsk accounts for 36.7% of the district's total population.

History
The district was established on September 5, 1927.

Notable residents 

Olimpiada Ivanova (born 1970), race walker
Olga Vasilyeva (born 1974), football player for Azerbaijan

References

Notes

Sources

Districts of Chuvashia
